The Denham Suspension Bridge, also known as the Garraway Stream Bridge is a footbridge in Guyana linking Mahdia to Bartica.  This suspension bridge was constructed over the Potaro River in an area known as Garraway Stream by a Scottish civil engineer and general contractor, John Aldi, on 6 November 1933.

The namesake for the bridge was the Governor of British Guiana (1930–1935), Sir Edward Brandis Denham (1876–1938), who opened the bridge with golden scissors according to the Montreal Gazette. The bridge and path was meant to shorten the journey to the Potaro gold fields by five days. Miners would later call the bridge, the Cassandra Crossing. 

In January 2020, the bridge was rehabilitated and reopened for light vehicles up to 10 tonnes. The bridge has been declared a regional monument.

See also
 List of bridges in Guyana

References

External links

The Bridge to El Dorado: The Story of the Denham Suspension Bridge by For the Culture Guyana

Bridges completed in 1933
Bridges in Guyana